Unified Silla, or Late Silla, is the name often applied to the Korean kingdom of Silla, one of the Three Kingdoms of Korea, after 668 CE. In the 7th century, a Silla–Tang alliance conquered Baekje in the Baekje–Tang War. Silla conquered the southern part of Goguryeo in the 7th century following the Goguryeo–Tang War and Silla-Tang War, unifying the central and southern regions of the Korean peninsula.

It existed during the Northern and Southern States period, when Balhae controlled the north of the peninsula. Unified Silla lasted for 267 years until, under King Gyeongsun, it fell to Goryeo in 935.

Terminology
North Korean historians criticize the term "Unified Silla" as traditionally "Unified Silla" is considered to be the first unified kingdom of the Korean people. According to the North Korean perspective, Goryeo was the first state to unify the Korean people as Silla failed to conquer the most part of Goguryeo and Balhae still existed after the establishment of "Unified Silla"; Balhae also occupied territory north of the Korean peninsula. North Korean historians use the term "Late Silla (후기신라)" as using the word "late" suggests that Silla never unified the Korean people as a whole. North Korea recognises Goryeo as the first country that unified the Korean people.

The people of Silla considered themselves to be a kingdom of unified Koreans and called it "삼한일통" which means unifying three kingdoms. As he lay on his death bed, one of the main generals "Gim-Yu-Shin (김유신)", wrote this term "삼한일통" in a letter to King Munmu. From this, the Kings of Silla continued to hold this perception and it may be seen in King Sinmun's instalment of "9 counties (9주)" and "9 서당 (9 Legions)". In ancient Asia, number 9 refers to great things, and 9 counties means a 'whole world (천하)'. More to this, Silla gave noble ranks to the nobles of Goguryeo and Baekje as a token of unification. So a historically more accurate term for this era would be Unified Silla.

History

In 660, King Munmu ordered his armies to attack Baekje. General Gim Yu-sin, aided by Tang forces, defeated General Gyebaek and conquered Baekje. In 661, he moved on Goguryeo but was repelled. Silla then fought against the Tang dynasty for nearly a decade.

During its heyday, the country contested with Balhae, a Goguryeo–Mohe kingdom, to the north for supremacy in the region. Throughout its existence, Unified Silla was plagued by intrigue and political turmoil in its newly conquered northern territory, caused by the rebel groups and factions in Baekje and Goguryeo, which eventually led to the Later Three Kingdoms period in the late 9th century.

Gyeongju remained the capital of Silla throughout the whole existence of the dynasty, which demonstrates the power of the governmental system employed in Silla. By using the “Bone Clan Class” system, a small group of powerful people (‘bone clan’) was able to rule over a large amount of subject people. To maintain this rule over a large number of people for an extensive period of time, it was important for the government to keep the unity of the bone system and hold the governed subjects in a low social status.

Despite its political instability, Unified Silla was a prosperous country, and its metropolitan capital of Seorabeol (present-day Gyeongju) was the fourth-largest city in the world at the time. Through close ties maintained with the Tang dynasty, Buddhism and Confucianism became the principal philosophical ideologies of the elite as well as the mainstays of the period's architecture and fine arts. Its last king, Gyeongsun, ruled over the state in name only and submitted to Wang Geon of the emerging Goryeo in 935, bringing the Silla dynasty to an end.

Government

Regional administration

Culture
Unified Silla carried on the maritime prowess of Baekje, which acted like the Phoenicia of medieval East Asia, and during the 8th and 9th centuries dominated the seas of East Asia and the trade between China, Korea and Japan, most notably during the time of Jang Bogo; in addition, Silla people made overseas communities in China on the Shandong Peninsula and the mouth of the Yangtze River.

Unified Silla was a golden age of art and culture, as evidenced by the Hwangnyongsa, Seokguram, and Emille Bell. Buddhism flourished during this time, and many Korean Buddhists gained great fame among Chinese Buddhists and contributed to Chinese Buddhism, including: Woncheuk, Wonhyo, Uisang, Musang, and Gim Gyo-gak, a Silla prince whose influence made Mount Jiuhua one of the Four Sacred Mountains of Chinese Buddhism.

Unified Silla and the Tang maintained close ties. This was evidenced by the continual importation of Chinese culture. Many Korean monks went to China to learn about Buddhism. The monk Hyech'o went to India to study Buddhism and wrote an account of his travels. Different new sects of Buddhism were introduced by these traveling monks who had studied abroad such as Son and Pure Land Buddhism.

Unified Silla conducted a census of all towns' size and population, as well as horses, cows and special products and recorded the data in Minjeongmunseo (민정문서). The reporting was done by the leader of each town.

A national Confucian college was established in 682 and around 750 it was renamed the National Confucian University. The university was restricted to the elite aristocracy. However, in Silla society, because the “Bones status” was used for the election of officials over the examination process that was used in Confucianism, the National Confucian University did not have great appeal to the nobility class of Silla.

Silla was very scientifically and technologically advanced for the time. There was an emphasis put on astrology especially as it was closely tied to agriculture. This allowed them to accurately record events such as solar eclipse and lunar eclipse.

Woodblock printing
Woodblock printing was used to disseminate Buddhist sutras and Confucian works. During a refurbishment of the "Pagoda That Casts No Shadows", an ancient print of a Buddhist sutra was discovered. The print is dated to 751 CE and is the oldest discovered printed material in the world.

See also
 History of Korea

Notes

References

Citations

Sources 
 

935 disestablishments
Silla
Silla
Former countries in Korean history
States and territories established in the 660s
668 establishments
Former monarchies of East Asia